Sunwal City, officially the Sunwal Municipal City, is the urbanized and the most populous city of Parasi District with 72,621 native inhabitants living in 18,689 households in 2021 and 0.11 million people in its urban agglomeration.

The city is one of the oldest continuously inhabited places in Lumbini, founded in the 15th century. The city was historically called the "Sunawal" and has been the home of the Brahmin, Chhetri, Gurung, Magar and Newar people, a cosmopolitan urban civilization in the Himalayan foothills. Today, it runs with the local government of the Nepalese republic, established in 2015, and is part of the Lumbini Province.

Demographics 
At the time of the 2011 Nepal census, Sunwal City had a population of 39,846 people living in 8,639 individual households. After the announcement of the municipality by combining two VDCs, the total population of Sunwal Municipality increased to more than 100,000, which is the highest in Nawalparasi district. Swathi alone had a population of 10,629 with 2,102 individual households.

There are informal settlements of squatters at Kerabari, Ramuwapur, Simaltari Charpala, Sirjanatole and Sundarbasti.

Nearby tourist attractions
The Ramagrama stupa is a stupa located in Ramgram Municipality, about 11 km from Sunwal. This Buddhist pilgrimage site, which was constructed around 2500 BCE, contains relics of Gautama Buddha. According to Buddhist texts, after Buddha's Mahaparinirvana, his cremated remains were divided and distributed among the princes of eight of the 16 mahājanapadās. Each of the princes constructed a stupa at or near his capital city, within which the respective portion of the ashes was enshrined. One of them was Rāmagrāma, a major city of the Koliya kingdom (sometimes referred to as Koliyanagara) at that time.

As of today, the Ramagrama stupa is the only intact and original stupa which contains relics of Buddha.

Notes

References

External links

Cost of Living Index in Nepal  - Statistics & Graphs of Nepalese Citizen's Economic Power, January 10, 2014
Central Bureau of Statistics, Final result of population and housing - census 2011, VDC/Municipality, Table 2 (p. 8)

Cities in Nepal
Nepal municipalities established in 2014
Populated places in Parasi District